NPPC may refer to:

 National Pork Producers Council, an American pork industry lobbying organization
Nobel Peace Prize Concert
Natriuretic peptide precursor C, a protein